Selandar is a mukim and town in Jasin District, Malacca, Malaysia.

Education
 SBP Integrasi Selandar - One of the two Fully Residential Schools in the state of Malacca and one of the 12 such schools in Malaysia.
 Selandar Community College
 Selandar Industrial Training Institute

Tourist attractions

 Bukit Batu Lebah Recreational Forest - A recreational forest situated in the Bukit Senggeh Forest Reserve built for hiking and caving activities.
 Bukit Langsat Recreational Forest
 Selandar Agro Park

References

Jasin District
Mukims of Malacca